The Seventh-day Adventist Church in Mizoram is formally organised as the Mizo Conference of Seventh-day Adventist. It is one of the conferences of the Northeast India Union of Seventh-day Adventists under the Southern Asia Division of Seventh-day Adventists. It currently has 81 Churches and 22,446 members.

History
Seventh-day Adventist Church arrived in 1946. It was initiated by Lallianzuala Sailo, who first made contact with the Seventh-day Adventist Church at Shillong in Meghalaya in November 1946. OW Lange was the first Adventist missionary to Mizoram. The first Adventist School was started by Willis G. Lowry and Helen Lowry on 17 January 1950. Mizoram section became the first conference in Southern Asia Division of Seventh-day Adventists in 1993.

Location

Its  office is located in Seventhday Tlang, Aizawl.

Media Center
Adventist World Radio (AWR) has a studio in Mizoram. It was inaugurated on February 27, 2003.

Institutions
Mizo Conference has the following Institutions:
Helen Lowry College of Arts & Commerce, Aizawl
Southern Flower School, Lunglei
Graceland Adventist School, Keifang
Adventist English Academy, Saitual
Pinehill Adventist Academy, Champhai
Adventist English Academy, Siaha
Adventist English School, Bazar Veng, Lunglei.
Adventist English School, West Phaileng
Millennium English School, Zemabawk

Hospital
It currently operates Aizawl Adventist Hospital,  and MED-AIM Adventist Hospital in Champhai.

See also
 Seventh-day Adventist Church
 List of Christian denominations in North East India
Seventh-day Adventist Church in India

References

External links
Mizo Adventists
Adventist Directory Locate Adventist Entities
Adventist Yearbook The Official Organizational Directory

History of the Seventh-day Adventist Church
Churches in Mizoram
Seventh-day Adventist Church in Asia
India
Christianity in Mizoram